The Agenzia nazionale per le nuove tecnologie, l'energia e lo sviluppo economico sostenibile (ENEA) (Italian National Agency for New Technologies, Energy and Sustainable Economic Development) is an Italian Government-sponsored research and development agency. The agency undertakes research in areas which will help to develop and enhance Italian competitiveness and employment, while protecting the environment. ENEA is an acronym that stands for Energia Nucleare ed Energie Alternative ("Atomic Energy and Alternative Energy").

History

Initially (1982), ENEA was an acronym that stood for Energia Nucleare ed Energie Alternative ("Atomic Energy and Alternative Energy"), according to its mission statement.

After a referendum against the production of atomic energy in Italy (following the Chernobyl nuclear reactor disaster in 1986) passed in 1987, in 1991 ENEA's mission statement was changed and, consequently, its complete name, which became Ente per le nuove tecnologie, l'energia e l’ambiente ("Agency for new technologies, energy and environment").

In January 1999 a new charter readdressed the goals for the agency as follows:
 To undertake initiatives aimed at developing, enhancing and promoting research and innovation, in keeping with Italy's EU and international commitments in terms of energy efficiency, environmental protection and technological innovation.
 To support the implementation of high-tech production processes, especially by promoting demand for research and technology oriented towards enhancing sustainable development.
 To promote the transfer of technology and developments in the fields of energy efficiency and environmental protection to public administrations and businesses, in keeping with national and EU guidelines.
 To provide, upon request, specialist technical and organisational support to administrations promoting public initiatives at the international, national, regional and local levels, in all the sectors falling within ENEA's purview.

In July 2009 the Italian parliament passed a law readdressing ENEA's mission statement, including to back atomic energy, and contextually changing its complete name to the current one.

After Fukushima Daiichi nuclear disaster in 2011 a second referendum against atomic energy production was held, and passed again. As the role of ENEA became contradictory to the referendum outcome, it was restructured once again in July 2015 and its mission statement was readdressed in order to be more coherent with the Italian energy policy.

In the nuclear sector ENEA participates in the development of the ITER fusion reactor to produce clean energy.

Research centers

Besides the headquarters in Rome, ENEA has the following research centers and laboratories in Italy:

 Bologna Research Center 
 Brasimone Research Center (near Bologna)
 Brindisi Research Center 
 Casaccia Research Center (Roma) 
 Faenza Research Laboratory
 Frascati Research Center 
 Ispra Research Laboratory
 Portici Research Center 
 Santa Teresa Research Center (Pozzuolo di Lerici, near La Spezia)
 Saluggia Research Center 
 Trisaia Research Center (near Rotondella)

References

External links 
  
 Some specialistic ENEA's research sites:
 CRESCO - Supercomputing and ENEA- Grid Center (Centro computazionale di RicErca sui Sistemi COmplessi) 
 Meta-Knowledge Engineering & Management (MKEM): High-Intelligent Socio-Cognitive Systems 
 Thermal-Fluid Dynamics 
 Biosensors & Bioelectronics - COSMIC: COupling Smart Molecules Into Chips

Government of Italy
Cold fusion